Koralia Karanti (born 1 October 1959) is a Greek actress of theatre and television.

Personal life
She is currently married to Giorgos Lianis, a known journalist and minister of socialist government, she has a son with her ex-husband Johnny Kalimeris.
She is the daughter of actress Afroditi Grigoriadou.

Filmography
"Erotas" (2005–2008; 2010–present) (TV Series)
"Venteta" (1999) TV Series as Hara
"Kokkino feggari, To" (1994) TV Series
"Africa" (1992) TV Series
"Dipsa, I" (1990) TV Series
"Lampsi ton Astron" (1983) TV Series
"Fos tou Aygerinou" (1982) TV Series
Kerithres (1981) (Greece: recut version)

External links

1959 births
Living people
Greek television actresses
Greek film actresses
Greek stage actresses
Greek female models
Greek television presenters
Greek women television presenters
Actresses from Athens